The Urania Award (known in Italian as the Premio Urania) is an annual literary competition run by the Italian magazine Urania for contemporary Italian science fiction novels. It was held for the first time in 1989.

List of winners

 Premio Omelas

References

Science fiction awards
Awards established in 1989
Italian literary awards
U
1989 establishments in Italy